The Royal Thai Air Force or RTAF is the air force of the Kingdom of Thailand. Since its establishment in 1913 as one of the earliest air forces of Asia, the Royal Thai Air Force has engaged in numerous major and minor conflicts. During the Vietnam War era, the RTAF was supplied with USAF-aid equipment.

History

Thailand's history of aviation began in January 1911, when a French pilot performed a flying demonstration over Bangkok. Prince Chakrabongse Bhuvanath, brother of King Vajiravudh, was in attendance and was greatly impressed, even accepting an invitation to fly aboard the plane. Chakrabongse arranged to send three army officers to France, who began aviation training at Vélizy-Villacoublay in July 1912. The officers became qualified aviators a year later, with one pursuing further training. In late 1913, the three new aviators returned to Thailand after arranging for the purchase of four Nieuport monoplanes and a Bréguet Aviation. The fledgling aviation section put on a successful demonstration in January 1914, gaining the support of the King. A permanent aviation group under the Army was established and an air base at Don Muang was designated.

After Thailand entered World War I on the side of the Allies in July 1917, an expeditionary force of around 1,200 men was sent to France in June 1918. Among the expeditionary force were a total of 370 pilots and groundcrew, including more than 100 officers. The officers were sent to flight school at Istres and Avord, but many had to be retrained at Istres, Le Crotoy, La Chapelle-la-Reine, Biscarosse and Piox as they were deemed incapable of high altitude flight. Eventually, 95 pilots qualified as military aviators, and they few several operational sorties in the closing weeks of the war. The Thai aviators suffered no casualties nor scored any kills, but their extensive training meant Thailand entered the post-WWI period with one of the best equipped and trained air forces in Asia.

In the 1930s, Thailand began to replace its ageing French planes with American materiel, purchasing more than 95 planes including the Boeing P-12E, Curtiss Hawks, and Vought Corsairs. The air force was formally separated into its own branch, the Royal Thai Air Force, in 1937. Five operational wings were also established in the reorganization. At the end of 1940, the RTAF once again entered combat, this time in a border conflict against French Indochina. The RTAF operated in the Mekong Delta, attacking ground forces and gunboats and defending against French bombing raids, until a ceasefire was arranged in January 1941. Later that year, on 7 December, Thailand was invaded by Japan. The RTAF, as the most openly anti-Japanese branch of the military, took an active role in the resistance. Combat Wings 1 and 5 engaged superior Japanese units at Thailand's eastern border, but suffered heavy losses (almost 30% in the case of Wing 5) before the cease-fire the following day.

Structure 

The Air Force is commanded by the Commander of the Royal Thai Air Force (ผู้บัญชาการทหารอากาศไทย). The Royal Thai Air Force Headquarters is located in Don Muang Airbase, Bangkok, Thailand.

The RTAF consists of headquarters and five groups: command, combat, support, education and training, and special services.

Headquarters Group
 Royal Flight Aircraft Administrative Center
 Royal Flight Helicopter Administrative Center
 Air Warfare Center
 Office of Public Sector Development, RTAF
 Office of Intellectual Development, RTAF

Command Group
 RTAF Secretariat
 Directorate of Administrative Service
 Directorate of Personnel
 Directorate of Intelligence
 Directorate of Operations
 Directorate of Logistics
 Directorate of Civil Affairs
 Directorate of Information and Communications Technology
 Office of the RTAF Comptroller
 Directorate of Finance
 Directorate of Inspector General
 Office of RTAF Internal Audit
 Office of RTAF Safety
 Office of RTAF Judge Advocate

Combat Group

The Royal Thai Air Force Combat Group is divided into 11 wings plus a training school, plus a few direct-reporting units.

Squadrons 
The following squadrons are currently active with the Royal Thai Air Force.

Support Group
 Directorate of Aeronautical Engineering
 Directorate of Communications and Electronics
 Directorate of Armament
 Directorate of Quartermaster
 Directorate of Civil Engineering
 Directorate of Transportation

Directorate of Medical Services 
First set up in 1913 in the same year as the Air Force, providing nursing services only, and over the years has gradually expanded. It operates Bhumibol Adulyadej Hospital and Royal Thai Air Force Hospital in Bangkok, as well as smaller hospitals at each wing. The directorate has made a teaching agreement with the Faculty of Medicine, Chulalongkorn University to train students at Bhumibol Adulyadej Hospital, accepting about 30 students per academic year.

Education and Training Group
 Directorate of Education and Training
 Air War College
 Air Command and Staff College
 Senior Air Officer School
 Squadron Officer School
 Officer Training School
 Academy Instructor School
 Non-Commissioned Officer School
 Air Technical Training School
 RTAF Language Center
 Personal Testing Center
 Technical Service Division
 Chaplain Division
 Navaminda Kasatriyadhiraj Royal Thai Air Force Academy

Special Service Group
 Research and Development Center for Space and Aeronautical Science and Technology
 Directorate of Welfare
 Office of Don Mueang RTAF Base Commander
 Institute of Aviation Medicine

Security Force Command 
The RTAF Security Force Command (Thai: หน่วยบัญชาการอากาศโยธิน) is a Division size unit in the Royal Thai Air Force. It has been in existence since 1937. They are based near Don Mueang International Airport. The RTAF Security Force Command is the main air force ground forces and special forces which providing light infantry for anti-hijacking capabilities, protecting air bases and high value assets, protecting international airport in insurgent areas. It also serves as the Royal Thai Air Force Special Operations Regiment (RTAF SOR) which consists of various units such as Combat Control Team (CCT), Pararescue Jumpers (PJs), Tactical Air Control Party (TACP). Royal Thai Air Force Security Force Command consist of 3 main regiments and multiple support units. Additionally, one separated air base protection battalions and one separated anti-aircraft battalions are station in each air bases.

Royal Thai Air Force bases 

The Royal Thai Air Force maintains a number of modern bases which were constructed between 1954 and 1968, have permanent buildings and ground support equipment.

All but one were built and used by United States forces until their withdrawal from Thailand in 1976 when the RTAF took over the installations at Takhli and Nakhon Ratchasima (Korat). In the late 1980s, these bases and Don Muang Air Base outside Bangkok, which the air force shares with civil aviation, remain the primary operational installations.

Maintenance of base facilities abandoned by the United States (Ubon, Udorn) proved costly and exceeded Thai needs; they were turned over to the Department of Civil Aviation for civil use. Nonetheless, all runways were still available for training and emergency use.

By 2004 the Royal Thai Air Force had its main base at Don Muang airport, adjacent to Don Mueang International Airport. The RTAF also had large air fields and facilities at Nakon Ratchasima Ubon Ratchathani, and Takhli.

Equipment

Aircraft

Armament

Budget
RTAF budgets are shown below by fiscal year (FY):

Rank structure

NOTE:Rank on paper, not actually used in the Royal Thai Air Force.

Aircraft insignia

Roundels

Tail markings

Sports

Brazilian jiu-jitsu 
The Siam Cup BJJ (Brazilian jiu-jitsu) International tournament was held at the Show DC stadium in Bangkok from 2017 in cooperation with the Arete BJJ dōjō, hosted by the Royal Thai Air Force. Each year, the tournament brings together more than 400 fighters from more than 50 countries to compete. The Siam Cup BJJ 2021 was scheduled to take place on May 8, but due to restrictions imposed for COVID-19 during the coronavirus pandemic, the Thai government temporarily postponed all sporting events.

See also
Royal Thai Air Force Museum
Royal Thai Armed Forces Headquarters
Military of Thailand
Royal Thai Army
Royal Thai Navy
Royal Thai Police
Napa-1

References
Notes

Comments

Bibliography

 Wieliczko, Leszek A. and Zygmunt Szeremeta. Nakajima Ki 27 Nate (bilingual Polish/English). Lublin, Poland: Kagero, 2004. 
 .

External links

RTAF Official website (English version)
Royal Thai Air Force Whitebook on Gripen program (Thai)
Royal Thai Air Force Press Release on Gripen program (Eng)
Royal Thai Air Force VDO on Gripen program (Thai)
Royal Thai Air Force Museum Many Historical Aircraft Here (English Page available)
Reports with drawings and pictures about the Royal Thai Air Force
Globalsecurity.org
Early history of the Airports of Thailand Authority
Japanese Aircraft In Royal Thai Air Force and Royal Thai Navy Service During WWII at j-aircraft.com

 
Military units and formations established in 1913
1913 establishments in Siam
Air forces by country
Military of Thailand